Brazilian disease is a phrase in economics to describe the situation in which the Brazilian real has strengthened (trading at around R$1.95 to the US dollar) on high prices for commodities such as soybeans, making Brazilian exports of manufactured goods uncompetitive in foreign markets. The term was coined to compare the economic situation facing Brazilian exports in the late 2000s to Dutch disease, an older term referring to similar conditions faced in the Netherlands in the 1960s and 1970s due to  massive  natural gas exports. The term "Brazilian disease" has not been widely used in economic literature or the news media.

See also
 Dutch disease
 Brazil Cost

References

Foreign trade of Brazil
Currencies of Brazil
Economics catchphrases